"Boy (I Need You)" is a song by American singer Mariah Carey, taken from her ninth studio album, Charmbracelet (2002). It was written by Carey, Justin Smith, Norman Whitfield and Cameron Giles, and produced by the former and Just Blaze. The song was released as the album's second single on November 26, 2002, by Island Def Jam and Carey's own label, MonarC Entertainment. Initially, "The One" had been chosen as the second single from the album, however, halfway through the filming of a music video for it, the singer decided to release "Boy (I Need You)" instead. Considered by Carey as one of her favorites, the track is a reworked version of rapper Cam'ron's song "Oh Boy" released earlier that year.

The song was met with generally mixed reviews from contemporary critics. Many praised Carey's versatility and considered it as one of the stand-out tracks of Charmbracelet for having a different production when compared to the others. However, the sample hook of the song was described as "annoying". The single failed to make much impact on the charts around the world; it reached number 68 on the US Billboard Hip-Hop/R&B Songs chart and number 57 on the US Hot Singles Sales chart. Elsewhere, the song reached the top-ten in Portugal, and the top-twenty in the United Kingdom, while peaking within the top-forty in Australia, the Netherlands, Ireland and New Zealand.

The music video, directed by Joseph Kahn, incorporates elements of Japanese culture and features Carey's alter-ego Bianca Storm. It was also the first time that Carey worked with Kahn in a music video, which premiered on an episode of MTV's Making the Video in 2003. Following the release of "Through the Rain", Carey embarked on several stateside, European and Asian promotional tours in support of Charmbracelet, as well as its accompanying singles. Carey performed "Boy (I Need You)" live on several television shows appearances around the world.

Background 

Following the heavy media coverage surrounding Carey's publicized breakdown and hospitalization, Carey's unprecedented $100 million five-album record deal with Virgin Records America (EMI Records) was bought out for $50 million. Carey later said that her time at Virgin was "a complete and total stress-fest [...] I made a total snap decision which was based on money and I never make decisions based on money. I learned a big lesson from that." Later that year, she signed a contract with Island Records, valued at more than $24 million, and launched the record label MonarC.

Recording and release

Carey started writing songs for then untitled Charmbracelet in 2002, before she signed the record deal. She decided to concentrate on "getting some much-needed rest" and traveled to Capri and moved into the studio, which she had reserved to record the album. While at Capri, Carey could focus on her writing and recording, without being subjected to any stress or pressure. According to her, she would write the songs in her apartment upstairs, and would record them at the studio downstairs, at night. Thus, most of the album was recorded in Capri although she traveled to Atlanta, New York and Philadelphia to record a few tracks. The result was that Charmbracelet was her "most personal album" she had ever made.

While Carey paved a lot of the album with slower and autobiographical ballads, she also attempted at making an album with a mixture of several different genres. According to Jon Pareles of The New York Times, the album showed off Carey's musical and vocal versatility, especially when viewing the differences in the record's first and second singles, "Ms. Carey is known for her voice, of course: she can hit high notes that barely sound human, and few singers leap around the octaves as gracefully as she does. But as she tries to regain her audience, her greatest weapon may be her versatility: Ms. Carey also knows how to make a hip-hop hit by holding back and letting the beat shine." Carey decided to work with Just Blaze after she heard the song "Oh Boy" he had produced for Cam'ron. Together they produced "Boy (I Need You)", a remake of "Oh Boy", and "You Got Me". Carey described the former as one of her favorites on the album. "It's definitely one of my favorites, 'cause I love the original. It was cool to have him out there doing his thing in such a random environment," she said. "Boy (I Need You)" was released as the second single from the album on November 26, 2002. Initially, "The One" was scheduled to be released as the second single and the music video was shot for the song. However, halfway through the filming, the track was changed to "Boy (I Need You)".

Reception
"Boy (I Need You)" received mostly mixed reviews from contemporary critics. Jon Pareles of The New York Times complimented the track on its differences with most of the content on Charmbracelet. Entertainment Weekly writer Tom Sincalir said that "the herky-jerky [track], on which Cam'ron guests, [adds] some welcome energy" to the album. Michael Paoletta of Billboard considered it as one of Charmbracelets stand-out tracks, while Slant Magazines Sal Cinquemani said "Boy (I Need You)", along with "You Got Me", "provide further evidence that Carey should keep her rappers on the remix." Stephen Thomas Erlewine of Allmusic noted that Carey did not "completely abandon hip-hop, but whenever it rears its head on Charmbracelet, it's utterly jarring" citing the song as an example, while describing the sampled vocal hook as "annoying". Erlewine, however, selected it as a Track Pick from the album review. The single failed to make much impact on the charts around the world; it reached number 68 on the US Billboard Hip-Hop/R&B Songs chart and number 57 on the US Hot Singles Sales chart. Elsewhere, the song reached number 17 in the United Kingdom, while peaking within the top 40 in Australia, the Netherlands, Ireland and New Zealand.

Music video and live performances

Described as "Speed Racer meets Hello Kitty meets me and Cam'ron" by Carey, the video was directed by Joseph Kahn, stars actor Will Yun Lee and incorporates elements of Japanese culture and features Carey's alter-ego Bianca Storm. When asked about the music video, Kahn replied, "To me, videos aren't movies, they're their own art form-like poetry. If you're a poet, you want to make poetry." Carey also revealed that the music video marked the first time she worked with Kahn. The music video production and recording was shown in a MTV's Making the Video episode in 2003. The video was likened to a "clear extension of Janet's "Doesn't Really Matter" for its similar settings and theme of Japanese pop culture. Following the release of "Through the Rain", Carey embarked on several stateside, European and Asian promotional tours in support of Charmbracelet, as well as its accompanying singles. Three days prior to the album's stateside release, a one-hour special titled Mariah Carey: Shining Through the Rain aired on MTV, in which Carey was interviewed and sang several songs from Charmbracelet and of her catalog. During the interview, Carey addressed rumors of her breakdown and its cause, as well as of the album and its inspiration, followed by a question and answer with fans. During the album's month of release, Carey appeared on several television talk shows, launching her promotional tour on Today, where she performed a four-song set-list at Mall of America for a crowd of over 10,000. Carey also performed the song on Top of the Pops and on The Graham Norton Show.

Formats and track listings

MC...Move the Crowd 12-inch vinyl
A1. "Boy (I Need You)"
A2. "Irresistible (West Side Connection)"
A3. "You Got Me"
B1. "Boy (I Need You)" (Instrumental)
B2. "Irresistible (West Side Connection)" (Instrumental)
B3. "You Got Me" (Instrumental)

UK CD1
 "Boy (I Need You)" (W/O Rap) – 3:12
 "Boy (I Need You)" (Panjabi Hit Squad Mix) – 4:14
 "Boy (I Need You)" (Copenhaniacs Remix) – 4:36
 "Boy (I Need You)" (Music Video)

UK CD2
 "Boy (I Need You)" – 5:15
 "Boy (I Need You)" (Street Remix) – 5:31
 "Boy (I Need You)" (Topnotch L8 Mix) – 4:11
 "Boy (I Need You)" (Topnotch Tox Mix) – 4:15

Boy (I Need You) - EP
 "Boy (I Need You)" (Street Remix) (featuring Cam’ron, Juelz Santana, Jimmy Jones & Freeway) – 5:31
 "Boy (I Need You)" (No Rap Version) – 3:14
 "Boy (I Need You)" (Remix By The Duke & MVP From Disco Montego) – 4:04
 "Boy (I Need You)" (Panjabi Hit Squad Mix) – 4:14
 "Boy (I Need You)" (Copenhaniacs Remix) – 4:36
 "Boy (I Need You)" (Topnotch L8 Mix) – 4:12
 "Boy (I Need You)" (Topnotch Tox Mix) – 4:17

Charts

Release history

Notes

References

2002 songs
2003 singles
Mariah Carey songs
Cam'ron songs
Music videos directed by Joseph Kahn
Song recordings produced by Just Blaze
Songs written by Norman Whitfield
Songs written by Mariah Carey
Island Records singles